Edward Barclay may refer to:

Edward Exton Barclay (1860–1948), English gentleman and foxhunter
David Edward Durell Barclay (1858–1918), 12th Baronet of the Barclay baronets
Edward Barclay, character in Round-Up Time in Texas

See also
Eddie Barclay (1921–2005), French music producer
Edward Berkeley (disambiguation)